Udaipura is a town and a nagar panchayat in Raisen district in the Indian state of Madhya Pradesh.  Udaipura has an average elevation of 321 metres (1,053 feet).

Demographics
 India census, Udaipura had a population of 13,790. Males constitute 54% of the population and females 46%. Udaipura has an average literacy rate of 65%, higher than the national average of 59.5%: male literacy is 72%, and female literacy is 57%. In Udaipura, 15% of the population is under 6 years of age.

References

Cities and towns in Raisen district
Raisen